The 2023 South American U-20 Championship will be an international football tournament to be held in Colombia from 19 January to 12 February 2023. The ten national teams involved in the tournament were required to register a squad of a minimum of 19 and a maximum of 23 players, including at least three goalkeepers (Regulations Article 49). Only players in these squads are eligible to take part in the tournament. The tournament exclusively requires players to be born between 1 January 2003 and 31 December 2007 to be eligible, that is, they must be a maximun of 20 years old and at least 16 years old (Regulations Article 46).

Each national team had to register its list of up to 23 players in the COMET system and then submit it to CONMEBOL by 5 January 2023, 18:00 PYST (UTC−3) (Regulations Articles 49 and 50). Teams are only permitted to make player replacements in cases of serious injuries up to 48 hours before the start of the tournament (Regulations Article 57). Teams are also permitted to replace an injured goalkeeper with another at any time during the tournament (Regulations Article 58). In addition, any player with positive PCR tests for SARS-CoV-2 may be replaced at any moment before and during the tournament (Regulations Article 60). All the substitutions must have the approval of the CONMEBOL Medical Commission.

The age listed for each player is as of 19 January 2023, the first day of the tournament. A flag is included for coaches who are of a different nationality than their own national team. Players name marked in bold have been capped at full international level.

Group A

Colombia
Colombia announced their squad of 23 players on 4 January 2023.

Head coach: Héctor Cárdenas

Argentina
Argentina announced their squad of 23 players on 6 January 2023.

Head coach: Javier Mascherano

Brazil
Brazil announced a first squad of 22 players on 8 December 2022, however, this list had to be modified because several clubs did not release their players who were called up. On 5 January 2022, Brazil announced their new squad of 23 players, with the following players being removed from the first 22-man list: defender Lucas Beraldo from São Paulo, midfielders Matheus França and Victor Hugo (both from Flamengo) and forwards Endrick and Giovani (both from Palmeiras), Marcos Leonardo and Ângelo (both from Santos) and Matheus Martins from Fluminense. On 11 January 2023, defender Michel was ruled out due to an injury, and was replaced by Jean Pedroso.

Head coach: Ramon Menezes

Paraguay
Paraguay announced their squad of 23 players on 5 January 2023.

Head coach: Aldo Bobadilla

Peru
Peru announced their squad of 23 players on 13 January 2023.

Head coach: Jaime Serna

Group B

Ecuador
Ecuador announced their squad of 23 players on 5 January 2023.

Head coach: Jimmy Bran

Uruguay
Uruguay announced their squad of 23 players on 3 January 2023. On 15 January 2023, defender Ignacio Rodríguez was withdrawn from the squad due to an injury and was replaced by Valentín Gauthier.

Head coach: Marcelo Broli

Venezuela
Venezuela announced their squad of 23 players on 17 January 2023.

Head coach:  Fabricio Coloccini

Chile
Chile announced their squad of 23 players on 7 January 2023. On 15 January 2023, goalkeeper Eduardo Villanueva was withdrawn from the squad due to an injury and was replaced by Pedro Garrido.

Head coach: Patricio Ormazábal

Bolivia
Bolivia announced their squad of 23 players on 17 January 2023.

Head coach: Pablo Escobar

References

South American U-20 Championship squads